Bobby Rowe is the name of:

Bobby Rowe (ice hockey) (1885–1948), Canadian ice hockey defenceman
Bobby Rowe (Australian footballer) (1883–1958), Australian rules footballer
Bobby Rowe (1934–2022), rodeo producer featured in Borat: Cultural Learnings of America for Make Benefit Glorious Nation of Kazakhstan
Bob Rowe (American football) (born 1945), former American football defensive lineman in the National Football League
Bob Rowe (born 1954), musician

See also
Robert Rowe (born 1938), Pennsylvania politician
Robert A. Roe (1924–2014), New Jersey politician